John Dixwell was an English regicide.

Dixwell may also refer to:

Dixwell (New Haven)
Dixwell baronets